Suletinden is a mountain in Norway. The mountain sits on the border of Vang Municipality in Innlandet county and Lærdal Municipality in Vestland county. The mountain is surrounded by several other notable mountains including Sulefjellet, Høgeloft, and Skoddetinden to the southeast.

See also
List of mountains of Norway by height

References

Lærdal
Vang, Innlandet
Mountains of Innlandet
Mountains of Vestland